The Alabama Crimson Tide baseball team represents the University of Alabama in NCAA Division I college baseball.  Along with most other Alabama athletic teams, the baseball team participates in the Western Division of the Southeastern Conference. The team plays its home games on campus at Sewell–Thomas Stadium.

History
The Crimson Tide baseball team leads the SEC in all-time wins with over 2,500 victories.  The program trails only LSU for the most SEC regular season titles with 13 and 7 tournament championships. Tide baseball teams have participated in the NCAA College World Series five times (1950, 1983, 1996, 1997, 1999), finishing second in 1983 and 1997. The Crimson Tide have also had over 60 players make it to the major leagues, the most in the SEC.

Stadium
The team's home venue is Sewell-Thomas Stadium, located in Tuscaloosa, Alabama on the campus of the University of Alabama. A tradition at Sewell-Thomas Stadium is to play the Rednex song "Cotton-Eyed Joe" during the  after the 7th inning. Sewell-Thomas Stadium is nicknamed "The Joe" by Crimson Tide fans, in honor of Baseball Hall of Fame member Joe Sewell, who played college baseball at Alabama. When Sewell played for Alabama, they were not in the Southeastern Conference.  This means that only Frank Thomas, of Auburn, is the only SEC player to make the Baseball HOF. For 12 of the last 13 seasons Alabama has ranked in the top 10 nationally in attendance.

In 2016 the team moved into the newly renovated Sewell-Thomas Stadium, a $42 million renovation making The Joe look like a totally new ball park. Club rooms, a kids playground, all chairback seats, and a new state of the art scoreboard were added.

Head coaches
Records are through the end of the 2022 season

Year-by-year results

* Alabama won the SEC tournament which determined the overall SEC champion from 1977–87.

Alabama in the NCAA tournament
The NCAA Division I baseball tournament started in 1947. The format of the tournament has changed through the years. The Crimson Tide has played in 25 NCAA Tournaments, winning 7 NCAA Regional Championships. Alabama has five College World Series appearances and played in the national championship game in 1983 and 1997.

Player awards

National awards
 Golden Spikes Award
Dave Magadan (1983)
 Baseball America College Player of the Year Award
Dave Magadan (1983)
 Johnny Bench Award
Jeremy Brown (2002)
 Baseball America Freshman of the Year Award
Wade LeBlanc (2004)
 Collegiate Baseball Freshman Player of the Year Award
Wade LeBlanc (2004)
 Senior CLASS Award
Emeel Salem (2007)

SEC awards
 Player of the Year Award
Kent Matthes (2009)
 Freshman of the Year Award
Wade LeBlanc (2004)

Alabama's First Team All-Americans

Former players

Current MLB players

National College Baseball Hall of Fame inductees 
In 2006, the National College Baseball Hall of Fame opened in Lubbock, Texas. Since then, Alabama has had 2 players inducted into the Hall of Fame.

Former Major Leaguers

Current roster

2017 Alabama Crimson Tide Baseball Roster

See also
 2019 Alabama Crimson Tide baseball team
 List of NCAA Division I baseball programs
 Alabama Crimson Tide
 Alabama Crimson Tide softball

References

External links